For Lady Day is an album by saxophonist Zoot Sims recorded in 1978 but not released by the Pablo label until 1991.

Reception

AllMusic reviewer Scott Yanow stated "tenor saxophonist Zoot Sims and pianist Jimmy Rowles' tribute to Billie Holiday is melodic, tasteful, and largely memorable ... they perform 11 songs associated with Holiday, including quite a few that would have been lost in obscurity if Lady Day had not uplifted them with her recordings ... A lyrical and heartfelt tribute".

Track listing
 "Easy Living" (Ralph Rainger, Leo Robin) – 3:42
 "That Old Devil Called Love" (Allan Roberts, Doris Fisher) – 5:01
 "Some Other Spring" (Arthur Herzog Jr., Irene Kitchings) – 4:57
 "I Cover the Waterfront" (Johnny Green, Edward Heyman) – 4:26
 "You Go to My Head" (J. Fred Coots, Haven Gillespie) – 5:49
 "I Cried for You" (Gus Arnheim, Abe Lyman, Arthur Freed) – 4:31
 "Body and Soul" (Green, Heyman, Frank Eyton, Robert Sour) – 3:21
 "Trav'lin' Light" (Trummy Young, Jimmy Mundy, Johnny Mercer) – 4:48
 "You're My Thrill" (Jay Gorney, Sidney Clare) – 3:45
 "No More" (Tutti Camarata, Bob Russell) – 3:04
 "My Man" (Maurice Yvain, Jacques Charles, Albert Willemetz, Channing Pollock) – 5:19

Personnel 
Zoot Sims – tenor saxophone
Jimmy Rowles – piano
George Mraz – bass
Jackie Williams – drums

References 

1991 albums
Zoot Sims albums
Pablo Records albums
Albums produced by Norman Granz
Billie Holiday tribute albums